Cycnia sparsigutta is a moth of the family Erebidae. It was described by Francis Walker in 1864. It is found in Sri Lanka.

References

Phaegopterina
Moths described in 1864